Grand River Mutual Telephone Corporation, doing business as GRM Networks, is a telephone company providing local telephone service in Iowa and Missouri, USA.

The cities served by the company in Iowa include Lamoni and Leon, and cities served in Missouri include Bethany, Conception Junction, and Mercer.

The company owns two smaller telephone companies: Lathrop Telephone Company d/b/a LTC Networks in Missouri and South Central Communications d/b/a SCC Networks in Iowa.

References

External links
Grand River Mutual Home

Communications in Missouri
Telecommunications companies of the United States
Telecommunications companies established in 1951
1951 establishments in Missouri